The Fort Frances Lakers are a junior A ice hockey team based in Fort Frances, Ontario, Canada. They play in the Superior International Junior Hockey League.

History

Jr. Sabres
Founded in 2007, the Fort Frances Jr. Sabres were the first junior A team to play in Fort Frances since the Fort Frances Borderland Thunder left the Superior International Junior Hockey League (SIJHL) after four seasons in 2005. The Borderland Thunder wanted to play in the Manitoba Junior Hockey League, but chose to go on hiatus when they did not receive clearance for the transfer. The Sabres new ownership group, led by Carolyn Kellaway, were approved as the seventh member of the SIJHL in 2007.

On September 14, 2007, the Fort Frances Jr. Sabres played their first game at home against the Thunder Bay Bulldogs, defeating the Bulldog 5–1 and also claiming their first team victory. Alessio Tomassetti scored the team's first goal 3:14 into the first period. Goaltender Ryan Faragher, a Fort Frances native, earned the win while making 29 saves.

Lakers
In the summer of 2009, the Fort Frances team nearly folded. With the Thunder Bay Bearcats and Schreiber Diesels leaving the SIJHL, the ownership of the Sabres decided to pull their team out of the 2009–10 season despite initially telling the press and the league that the team was operating and would not be sitting out during the coming season. It was later revealed the franchise would be sold to new ownership, but as the season drew nearer, the team had not found a buyer. In an effort to keep the team alive, the community took over the franchise and turned it into a non-profit organization. On September 10, 2009, the team rebranded by changing their name to the Lakers.

The reborn community-owned Lakers played their first game as a non-profit organization on September 17, 2009, in Fort Frances against the defending league champion Fort William North Stars in their home opener. The Lakers lost 5–2 with an empty net goal. A night later, the Lakers won the first game of their new era by defeating the expansion Thunder Bay Wolverines in Thunder Bay 3–2.

Season-by-season

Dudley Hewitt Cup
Central Canada Jr. A Championships'''NOJHL – OJHL – SIJHL – Host''Round-robin play with 2nd vs. 3rd in semifinal to advance against 1st in the championship game.

References

External links
Fort Frances Lakers
Superior International Junior Hockey League

Superior International Junior Hockey League teams
Ice hockey teams in Ontario
Sport in Northern Ontario
Fort Frances
Ice hockey clubs established in 2007
2007 establishments in Ontario